A mechanical computer is a computer built from mechanical components such as levers and gears rather than electronic components. The most common examples are adding machines and mechanical counters, which use the turning of gears to increment output displays. More complex examples could carry out multiplication and division—Friden used a moving head which paused at each column—and even differential analysis. One model, the Ascota 170 accounting machine sold in the 1960s calculated square roots.

Mechanical computers can be either analog, using continuous or smooth mechanisms such as curved plates or slide rules for computations; or discrete, which use mechanisms like pinwheels and gears.

Mechanical computers reached their zenith during World War II, when they formed the basis of complex bombsights including the Norden, as well as the similar devices for ship computations such as the US Torpedo Data Computer or British Admiralty Fire Control Table. Noteworthy are mechanical flight instruments for early spacecraft, which provided their computed output not in the form of digits, but through the displacements of indicator surfaces. From Yuri Gagarin's first spaceflight until 2002, every crewed Soviet and Russian spacecraft Vostok, Voskhod and Soyuz was equipped with a Globus instrument showing the apparent movement of the Earth under the spacecraft through the displacement of a miniature terrestrial globe, plus latitude and longitude indicators.

Mechanical computers continued to be used into the 1960s, but were quickly replaced by electronic calculators, which—with cathode-ray tube output—emerged in the mid-1960s. The evolution culminated in the 1970s with the introduction of inexpensive handheld electronic calculators. The use of mechanical computers declined in the 1970s and was rare by the 1980s, when digital computers prevailed.

In 2016, NASA announced that its Automaton Rover for Extreme Environments program would use a mechanical computer to operate in the harsh environmental conditions found on Venus.

Examples

 Antikythera mechanism, c. 100 BC – A mechanical astronomical clock.
 Cosmic Engine, 1092 – Su Song's hydro-mechanical astronomical clock tower invented during the Song dynasty, which featured the use of an early escapement mechanism applied to clockwork.
 Castle clock, 1206 – Al-Jazari's castle clock, a hydropowered mechanical astronomical clock, was the earliest programmable analog computer.
 The Astrarium was a complex astronomical clock built in 1348 by Giovanni Dondi dell'Orologio. The Astrarium had seven faces and 107 moving parts; it could show and predict the positions of the sun, the moon, stars and the five planets then known, as well as religious feast days.
 Pascaline, 1642 – Blaise Pascal's arithmetic machine primarily intended as an adding machine which could add and subtract two numbers directly, as well as multiply and divide by repetition.
 Stepped Reckoner, 1672 – Gottfried Wilhelm Leibniz's mechanical calculator that could add, subtract, multiply, and divide.
 Difference Engine, 1822 – Charles Babbage's mechanical device to calculate polynomials.
 Analytical Engine, 1837 – A later Charles Babbage device that could be said to encapsulate most of the elements of modern computers.
 Odhner Arithmometer, 1873 - W. T. Odhner's calculator who had millions of clones manufactured until the 1970s.
 Ball-and-disk integrator, 1886 – William Thomson used it in his Harmonic Analyser to measure tide heights by calculating coefficients of a Fourier series.
 Dumaresq, 1902 - Royal Navy fire control computer
 Percy Ludgate's 1909 Analytical Machine – The 2nd of only two mechanical Analytical Engines ever designed.
 Dreyer Fire Control Table, 1911 - Royal Navy fire control computer
 Marchant Calculator, 1918 – Most advanced of the mechanical calculators. The key design was by Carl Friden.
 Admiralty Fire Control Table, 1922 - Royal Navy advanced fire control computer.
 István Juhász Gamma-Juhász (gun director) (early 1930s)
 Kerrison Predictor ("late 1930s"?)
 Z1, 1938 (ready in 1941) – Konrad Zuse's mechanical calculator (although part imprecisions hindered its function)
 Mark I Fire Control Computer, deployed by the United States Navy during World War II (1939 to 1945) and up to 1969 or later.
 Curta calculator, 1948
 MONIAC, 1949 – An analog computer used to model or simulate the UK economy.
 Voskhod Spacecraft "Globus" IMP navigation instrument, early 1960s
 Digi-Comp I, 1963 – An educational 3-bit digital computer
 Digi-Comp II, mid 1960s – A rolling ball digital computer
 Automaton – Mechanical devices that, in some cases, can store data and perform calculations, and perform other complicated tasks.
 Turing Tumble, 2017– An educational Turing-complete computer partially inspired by the Digi-Comp II

Electro-mechanical computers

Early electrically powered computers constructed from switches and relay logic rather than vacuum tubes (thermionic valves) or transistors (from which later electronic computers were constructed) are classified as electro-mechanical computers. 
These varied greatly in design and capabilities, with some units capable of floating point arithmetic. Some relay-based computers remained in service after the development of vacuum-tube computers, where their slower speed was compensated for by good reliability. Some models were built as duplicate processors to detect errors, or could detect errors and retry the instruction. A few models were sold commercially with multiple units produced, but many designs were experimental one-off productions.

See also
 Analog computer
 Billiard-ball computer
 Domino computer
 History of computing hardware
 List of pioneers in computer science
 Mechanical calculator
 Spirule
 Tide-Predicting Machine No. 2
 Turing completeness

References

External links
 Electro-mechanical Harwell computer in action
 

 
Electro-mechanical computers